Queen Sinjeong of the Hwangju Hwangbo clan (d. 19 August 983) was the fourth wife of Taejo of Goryeo who became the mother of Daejong of Goryeo and Queen Daemok. All of the Goryeo kings after Gyeongjong were her descendants.

Biography

Early life
The future Queen Sinjeong was born as the daughter of Hwangbo Je-gong, Duke Chungui (황보제공 충의공) who was one of the Three Major Grand Masters (태위 삼중대광, 太尉 三重大匡) from Hwangju, Hwanghaebuk-do.

Marriage and Palace life
She married Wang Geon (왕건) as his second wife after he ascended the throne as the first King of Goryeo. Since at that time he already had a Queen, Hwangbo initially became a Royal consort and was given the royal title of Lady Hwangjuwon (황주원부인, 黃州院夫人; "Lady of the Hwangju Courtyard"). Together, they had a son who would become the father of King Seongjong and a daughter who later became the first wife of King Gwangjong. One of Geon's grandson, King Gyeongjong honoured her as Grand Lady Myeongbok (명복궁대부인, 明福宮大夫人) and ordered her to live in Myeongbok Palace (명복궁, 明福宮).

Later life
She outlived her husband by 40 years and died at about 80 years old. Since her only son and his wife died young, all of their children were raised by Queen Sinjeong and she devoted her entire affection to them. It as said that Queen Sinjeong had a virtuous personality and was respected by the officials for being frugal and wise.

After her death on 19 August 983, she was promoted from a Royal consort's position into Queen Mother Sinjeong (신정왕태후, 神靜王太后) and was buried in Sureung tomb; she also received a posthumous name.

Posthumous name
In April 1002 (5th year reign of King Mokjong), name Jeong-heon (정헌, 定憲) was added.
In March 1014 (5th year reign of King Hyeonjong), name Ui-gyeong (의경, 懿敬) was added.
In April 1027 (18th year reign of King Hyeonjong), name Seon-deok (선덕, 宣德) was added.
In October 1056 (10th year reign of King Munjong), name Ja-gyeong (자경, 慈景) was added.

In popular culture
Portrayed by Ahn Hae-sook in the 2002–2003 KBS TV series The Dawn of the Empire.
Portrayed by Ban Hyo-jung in the 2009 KBS2 TV series Empress Cheonchu.
Portrayed by Jung Kyung-soon in the 2016 SBS TV series Moon Lovers: Scarlet Heart Ryeo.

References

External links

Consorts of Taejo of Goryeo
Year of birth unknown
983 deaths
10th-century Korean women
9th-century Korean women
People from North Hwanghae